is a multi-use stadium in Utsunomiya, Tochigi, Japan. 

Originally it was a stadium with a single concrete stand and grass terraces on the other sides. A new concrete stand was built opposite the main stand and opened for the 2011 season. The stadium's capacity is 18,025 people. 

It is also used sometimes for Top League rugby games.

External links
Official Site at J. League Web
Official Site at Tochigi Prefecture Web

Utsunomiya
Football venues in Japan
Rugby union stadiums in Japan
Sports venues in Tochigi Prefecture
Sports venues completed in 1993
1993 establishments in Japan
Tochigi SC